Black Veil Brides, also known as Black Veil Brides IV, is the fourth studio album by American rock band Black Veil Brides. It was released through Lava Records/Republic Records on October 27, 2014. The first track on the album, "Heart of Fire", was aired on BBC Radio 1's Rock Show in September, then "Faithless" was uploaded onto YouTube on September 10. Also, as of September 16, 2014, the album was released on iTunes for pre-order. Clips of the songs "Devil in the Mirror" and "Goodbye Agony" were posted on YouTube on the 18th and 19th, as well as "Goodbye Agony" airing on BBC Radio 1's Rock Show on the same day of its uploading. The music video for "Goodbye Agony" was released on October 31, 2014.

Release and reception 

The album debuted at number 10 on the Billboard 200 chart, making it the band's second consecutive album to debut in the top 10. The album reached 13 on the Canadian Albums Chart and also charted in the United Kingdom at 17. The album received mixed reviews from critics.

Track listing

Personnel

Black Veil Brides
 Andy Biersack - lead vocals
 Jake Pitts - lead guitar
 Jeremy 'Jinxx' Ferguson - rhythm guitar, backing vocals, violin
 Ashley Purdy - bass, backing vocals
 Christian 'CC' Coma - drums, percussion

Additional musicians
 Marc LaFrance, David Steele, Angie Fisher, Nikki Grier and Tiffany Loren - additional background vocals
 John Webster - additional keyboards

Production
 Bob Rock - production, mixing, engineering
 Jake Pitts - engineering
 Eric Helmkamp - mixing assistant, engineering
 Ryan Enockson, Adam Greenholtz and Ken Eisennagel - assistant engineering
 Ted Jensen - mastering at Sterling Sound, New York, NY
 Jason Flom - A&R

Management
 Blasko (Mercenary Management, Inc.) - management
 Dan Tsurif and Nicole Schrad - management assistants
 Dina LaPolt (LaPolt Law, P.C.) - legal representation
 Tom Reed and Jodi Williams (Affiliated Group) - business management
 Tim Borror and Ash Avildsen (The Agency Group) - U.S. booking
 Geoff Meall (The Agency Group) - European booking

Artwork
 Richard Villa III - illustration and design
 Jonathan Weiner - photography

Charts

References

2014 albums
Albums produced by Bob Rock
Albums recorded at The Warehouse Studio
Black Veil Brides albums
Lava Records albums